Elaeocarpus coorangooloo, commonly known as brown quandong or Coorangooloo quandong, is a species of flowering plant in the family Elaeocarpaceae and is endemic to north-east Queensland in Australia. It is a tree with elliptic leaves, white flowers with lobed petals, and spherical fruit.

Description
Old leaves turn red before falling.

Taxonomy
Elaeocarpus coorangooloo was first formally described in 1917 by John Frederick Bailey and Cyril Tenison White in the Botany Bulletin of the Department of Agriculture, Queensland, from material collected by H.W. Mocatta in the Atherton district.

Distribution and habitat

Conservation status
Brown quandong is listed as 'near threatened' under the Queensland Government Nature Conservation Act 1992.

See also
 List of Elaeocarpus species

References

coorangooloo
Oxalidales of Australia
Flora of Queensland
Plants described in 1984
Endemic flora of Australia